An exhibition mine is a mine that's accessible to the public and contains exhibitions about that particular mine and about the coal industry in general, effectively doubling as a museum.

Notable exhibition mines
 Pocahontas Exhibition Coal Mine - Pocahontas, Virginia, United States
 Fell Exhibition Slate Mine - Trier, Germany
 Phillips-Sprague Mine - on the National Register of Historic Places in New River Park, Beckley, West Virginia

References

Mining
Types of museums